Chyung Ay is an agricultural engineer., He has retired from university professor.

Early life
Born in Taiwan, Chyung Ay was educated at National Chung Hsing University, graduating with an undergraduate degree in 1980. He then studied for a Master's degree at National Taiwan University, graduating in 1982. In 1992, he received his Ph.D. degree in food engineering from University of Wisconsin-Madison, USA.

Career
In 1997, Chyung Ay joined the Department of Biomechatronic Engineering at National Chiayi University. 
From 2000 - 2006, He became Dean of College of Science and Engineering at the university. In 2014, he 
was appointed university vice president. In 2018, he became the university president. In January 2022, he has retired from university.

Awards
Chyung Ay received the academic achievement award and education achievement award from the Chinese Institute of Agricultural Machinery, Taiwan in 2001 and 2007 respectively.

References 

Living people
Academic staff of the National Chiayi University
National Taiwan University alumni
National Chung Hsing University alumni
University of Wisconsin–Madison College of Agricultural and Life Sciences alumni
Agricultural engineers
Year of birth missing (living people)